WGNY (1220 AM) is a radio station broadcasting an oldies format. Licensed to Newburgh, New York, the station serves the Newburgh-Middletown area and is currently owned by Sunrise Broadcasting Corporation.

Early history

WGNY signed on as the Hudson Valley's first radio station on February 25, 1933, owned by wealthy real estate developer Robert Wilson Goelet. Goelet built his estate, Glenmere mansion, in the town of Chester, New York in 1911; in 1932, he decided to create a radio station that would broadcast from its grounds. (Goelet wanted the call letters WCNY, for "Chester, New York", but as they were already taken, he settled for WGNY.)

In 1937, WGNY moved its operations to 161 Broadway in Newburgh; the following year, Goelet sold out to Merritt C. Speidel and the WGNY Broadcasting Company. Originally at 100 watts, WGNY upped its power to 250 watts in 1940 (and eventually 10,000 watts in the 1970s). Billing itself as "The Only Radio Station Between Albany and New York City", WGNY would have Orange County, New York to itself until Middletown's WALL signed on in 1942. (During the 1940s and 50s WGNY would have satellite studios in Middletown and Poughkeepsie.)

In 1952, WGNY switched news affiliations from the United Press to the AP, while Speidel retired and was replaced as president by George W. Bingham. In 1953, a third station in Orange County signed on -- WDLC in Port Jervis, New York—but WGNY's listening dominance in the county was near-total, capturing over half the audience as late as the mid-1950s.

More changes came in 1958, when WGNY Broadcasting sold out to Orange County Broadcasting, Inc., and studios were moved to Little Britain Road in New Windsor, New York, where they remain to this day.

WGNY-FM
In the fall of 1966, FM radio came to Orange County, with WFMN ("FM Newburgh") reaching the air on October 29, followed by Middletown's WALL-FM on November 11. WFMN, owned by brothers Wilbur and Donald Nelson, broadcast at 103.1 MHz and moved into 104 Broadway in Newburgh—just down the street from the old WGNY studios. WFMN and WGNY remained competitors until 1974, when WGNY bought out Stereo Newburgh, Inc. (who had bought WFMN the previous year). WFMN changed its calls to WGNY-FM in 1985, then to WJGK in 2010. Starting in February 2011, a new WGNY-FM in Rosendale, New York began duplicating WGNY's AM signal on 98.9 MHz; meanwhile, translator W231BP in Chester (WGNY's original location) began carrying WJGK's programming at 94.1 FM.

1960s and onward
In 1968, Hudson Horizons (Kenneth Cowan, president) acquired WGNY; the following year, the station's lock on Orange County was loosened more with the signing-on of WTBQ in Warwick, New York.

In the 1990s, WGNY sought a new transmitter site and a change to 1200 kHz; the FCC turned down the frequency change, and the Town of New Windsor nixed the new site.

21st century and WDLC simulcast
In recent years, WGNY has switched back and forth between oldies and sports. In March 2005, WGNY-AM-FM began a Local Marketing Agreement with Port Jervis' WDLC and WTSX, with the four stations combining air staffs. WGNY began simulcasting a 1955-72 Oldies format with WDLC until January 2007, when WDLC dropped the oldies format in favor of a sports talk format from ESPN Radio. In February 2009, WDLC returned to the WGNY simulcast.

In 2013-14, WGNY saw three format changes in a little over twelve months: first, on April 3, 2013, they switched back to ESPN Radio. A dispute with the all-sports chain led WGNY to switch back to oldies (simulcasting WGNY-FM) on March 17, 2014; less than a month later, on April 16, 2014, WGNY re-joined ESPN.

In February 2017, WGNY switched to a Country format simulcasting sister station 103.1 WJGK HD-2 as "Today's Best Country Fox Country 1220 and Fox Country 103.1 HD2.
Sometime in August 2017, WGNY switched back to an Oldies format, simulcasting sister station 98.9 WGNY-FM, as "Oldies 98.9/105.3/1220".

References

External links

Goelet family
GNY
Oldies radio stations in the United States
Radio stations established in 1933
1933 establishments in New York (state)